Cheilopogon dorsomacula is a species of fish in the family Exocoetidae.

References 

Beloniformes
Animals described in 1944